Ionikos Nikaias B.C. in international competitions is the history and statistics of Ionikos Nikaias B.C. in FIBA Europe and Euroleague Basketball Company European-wide professional club basketball competitions.

European competitions

Game notes

FIBA Korać Cup (3rd-tier)

1979–80

FIBA Korać Cup 1979–80: 31–10–1979, Platonas Gymnasium: Ionikos Nikaias vs. BBC Nyon 113–104 (44–42)
Ionikos Nikaias (coach: Kostas Anastasatos): Panagiotis Giannakis 32, Stathis Sarantaenas 22, Tasos Bezantakos 21, Kostas Petridis 7, Makis Katsafados 4, Theodoros Bolatoglou 8, Gourgiotis 7, Kostas Alexandridis 4, Bezantakos 8.
BBC Nyon (coach: Michel Favre): Orval Jordan 32, Kevin Goetz 26, Jean-Jacques Nussbaumer 17, Dominique Briachetti 4, Michel Girardet 21, Carlos Paredes 4.

FIBA Korać Cup 1979–80: 7–11–1979, Salle du Rocher (500): BBC Nyon vs. Ionikos Nikaias 95–83 (52–39) 
BBC Nyon (coach: Michel Favre): Orval Jordan 31, Kevin Goetz 28, Thierry Genoud, Jean-Jacques Nussbaumer 12, Dominique Briachetti 18, Michel Girardet 2, Carlos Paredes 4.
Ionikos Nikaias (coach: Kostas Anastasatos): Panagiotis Giannakis 42, Tasos Bezantakos 1, Theodoros Bolatoglou 7, Kostas Petridis 2, Bourgis, Gourgiotis 2, Spyros Benetatos 6, Stathis Sarantaenas 11, Makis Katsafados 12.

1984–85

FIBA Korać Cup 1984–85: 3–10–1984, Platonas Gymnasium: Ionikos Nikaias vs. Hapoel Haifa 74–77 (40–35)
Ionikos Nikaias: Kostas Alexandridis 24, Odysseas Antoniou 6, Angelidis 2, Kostas Petridis 7, Gourgiotis 3, Vangelis Pertesis 19, Georgios Kalafatakis 9, Tsikimis 4, Nydriotis.
Hapoel Haifa (coach: Roni Shiftan): Ronald Houston 25, Haim Zlotikman 22, Jonathan Dalzell 15, Barry Leibowitz 6, Itai Shavit 3, Alon Ofir 2, Motti Amisha 2, Doron Kaski 2.

FIBA Korać Cup 1984–85: 10–10–1984, Romema Arena (500): Hapoel Haifa vs. Ionikos Nikaias            112–74 (58–38)
Hapoel Haifa (coach: Roni Shiftan): Ronald Houston 28, Haim Zlotikman 11, Jonathan Dalzell 21, Barry Leibowitz 4, Itai Shavit 12, Alon Ofir 12, Motti Amisha 2, Doron Kaski 18, Roni Haimowitz 2, David Ben-Elul 2.
Ionikos Nikaias : Bartimis 20, Kostas Alexandridis 15, Sardanis 11, Batridis 9, Tsikimis 7, Agladis 6, Aklapatigis 4, Fotis Katsikaris 2.

See also 
 Greek basketball clubs in international competitions

References

External links
FIBA Europe
EuroLeague
ULEB
EuroCup

European
Greek basketball clubs in European and worldwide competitions